Julius Kaljo (4 January 1910 – 12 May 1954) was an Estonian footballer. He played in 16 matches for the Estonia national football team from 1931 to 1938. He was also named in Estonia's squad for the Group 1 qualification tournament for the 1938 FIFA World Cup.

References

1910 births
1954 deaths
Estonian footballers
Estonia international footballers
Footballers from Tallinn
Association football midfielders